Penstemon , the beardtongues, is a large genus of roughly 280 species of flowering plants native mostly to the Nearctic, but with a few species also found in the North American portion of the Neotropics. It is the largest genus of flowering plants endemic to North America. Formerly placed in the family Scrophulariaceae by the Cronquist system, new genetic research has placed it in the vastly expanded family Plantaginaceae.

They have opposite leaves, partly tube-shaped, and two-lipped flowers and seed capsules. The most distinctive feature of the genus is the prominent staminode, an infertile stamen. The staminode takes a variety of forms in the different species; while it is typically a long straight filament extending to the mouth of the corolla, some are longer and extremely hairy, giving the general appearance of an open mouth with a fuzzy tongue protruding and inspiring the common name beardtongue.

Most penstemons form a durable woody stem (a caudex) and have persistent basal leaves, but some are fully deciduous perennials, the remainder being shrubs or subshrubs. Heights can range from 10 cm to as much as 3 metres. Along with their variable growth forms the penstemons have highly variable leaves, often with differnet leaf shapes on different parts of the same plant. Some species have highly reduced needle like leaves and others broad and rounded leaves, with their texture also running the range of hairy to smooth/glaborous. In the view of penstemon expert Robert Nold the defining evolutionary characteristic of the genus is adaptation to drought, as demonstrated by their numbers and diversity in the interior west of North America.

The one Asiatic species previously treated in Penstemon is now placed in a separate genus Pennellianthus. This leaves Penstemon a mostly Nearctic genus, with a few neotropical species. Although widespread across North America, and found in habitats ranging from open desert to moist forests, and up to the alpine zone, they are not typically common within their range.

History 
John Mitchell published the first scientific description in 1748; although he only named it as Penstemon, researchers David Way, Peter James, and Robert Nold identify it as P. laevigatus. Linnaeus then included it in his 1753 publication, as Chelone pentstemon, altering the spelling to better correspond to the notion that the name referred to the unusual fifth stamen (Greek "penta-", five). The botanist Casimir Schmidel published a description of the species in 1763, and for this reason he is given priority in botanical publication. Mitchell's work was reprinted in 1769, continuing with his original spelling, and this was ultimately accepted as the official form, although Pentstemon continued in use into the 20th century.

Although several more species were found in the early 18th century, they continued to be classified in Chelone until 1828 in some publications. The period of 1810 to 1850 increased the number of known species from 4 to 63, as expeditions traveled through Mexico and the western United States, followed by another 100 up to 1900. Though it should be noted not all these species remained classified as Penstemon.

The American members of the genus were extensively revised by David D. Keck between 1932 and 1957 and Richard Straw did similar work on the Mexican species slightly later. In 1960 the important book Penstemon Taxonomy was published by American Penstemon Society president Ralph Bennett with the advice of Keck. This book was updated and republished with the Robin Lodewick in 1980 and continued to be an important source of information about the genus through the year 2000.

Fieldwork in the remote parts of the Great Basin during the 20th century brought the total number of species known to over 270, though some of this total may be errors or now extinct species.

Horticulture 
Although penstemons are among the most attractive native flowers of North America, Europe has traditionally been far more active in their hybridization with hundreds of hybrids developed since the early 19th century. The first offer of seeds for sale as by John Fraser in 1813. The earliest development is somewhat shrouded in mystery; for instance Flanagan & Nutting's 1835 catalog mentions a 'Penstemon Hybridum' but does not describe it.

By 1860, a half-dozen French growers are known to have developed hybrids, most notably Victor Lemoine, while in 1857 the German Wilhelm Pfitzer listed 24 varieties. In 1861 the British Royal Horticultural Society held trials in which 78 varieties were entered. The Scottish firm of John Forbes first offered penstemons in 1870, eventually becoming the biggest grower in the world; in 1884 their catalog listed 180 varieties. By 1900 Forbes had offered 550 varieties, while Lemoine had developed nearly 470 by the time of his death in 1911. Few of these have survived to the present day.

A number of different species have been used in the hybridization process, notably P. cobaea and P. hartwegii.

The American Penstemon Society was formed in 1946 to promote both horticultural and botanical interest.

In North America, penstemons are often used in xeriscape landscaping, as many are native to desert or alpine regions and thus quite hardy. One of the largest collections of penstemons in North America is found at The Arboretum at Flagstaff, Arizona, which hosts a Penstemon Festival each summer.

Cultivars
The following species and cultivars have gained the Royal Horticultural Society's Award of Garden Merit:- 

 'Andenken an Friedrich Hahn' (deep red)

 'Beech Park' (pink/white)

 'Connie's Pink' (rose pink)
 'Evelyn' (rose pink)
 'George Home' (red/white)
 'Hewell Pink Bedder' (pink/white)
 'Hidcote Pink'
 'Margery Fish' (purple/blue)
 'Maurice Gibbs' (purple-red/white)
 'Osprey' (pink/white)
 P. hartwegii (scarlet)
 P. isophyllus (pale pink)
 P. pinifolius 'Wisley Flame' (orange-red)
 P. rupicola (pink)

 'Port Wine' (deep red/white)
 'Raven' (purple/white)
 'Rich Ruby' 
 'Roy Davidson' (pink/white)
 'Rubicundus' (red/white)
 'Schoenholzeri' (red)
 'Sour Grapes' (purple/blue)
 'Stapleford Gem' (purple/blue)

Others include 'Dark Towers', developed by Dale Lindgren at the University of Nebraska.

Species 
These 269 species are valid according to both World Flora Online (WFO) and Plants of the World Online (POWO) as of 2023.

 Penstemon abietinus Pennell – Firleaf beardtongue
 Penstemon absarokensis Evert – Absaroka Range beardtongue
 Penstemon acaulis L.O.Williams – Stemless beardtongue
 Penstemon acuminatus Douglas ex Lindl. – Sharpleaf penstemon
 Penstemon alamosensis Pennell & G.T.Nisbet – Los Alamos beardtongue
 Penstemon albertinus Greene – Alberta beardtongue
 Penstemon albidus Nutt. – White penstemon
 Penstemon albomarginatus M.E.Jones – White margin penstemon, whitemargin beardtongue, whitemargin penstemon
 Penstemon ambiguus Torr. – bush penstemon, gilia beardtongue, gilia penstemon
 Penstemon ammophilus N.H.Holmgren & L.M.Schultz – sandloving penstemon
 Penstemon amphorellae Crosswh.
 Penstemon anguineus Eastw. – Siskiyou beardtongue
 Penstemon angustifolius Nutt. ex Pursh – broad-beard beardtongue, broadbeard beardtongue, narrowleaf penstemon
 Penstemon arenarius Greene – Nevada sanddune beardtongue, sanddune penstemon
 Penstemon arenicola A.Nelson – sand penstemon
 Penstemon aridus Rydb. – stiffleaf penstemon
 Penstemon arkansanus Pennell – Arkansas beardtongue
 Penstemon atropurpureus (Sweet) G.Don
 Penstemon attenuatus Douglas – sulphur penstemon
 Penstemon atwoodii S.L.Welsh – Kaiparowits beardtongue
 Penstemon auriberbis Pennell – Colorado beardtongue
 Penstemon australis Small – Eustis Lake beardtongue
 Penstemon azureus Benth. – azure penstemon
 Penstemon baccharifolius Hook. – baccharisleaf beardtongue 
 Penstemon barbatus (Cav.) Roth – Golden-beard Penstemon or Beardlip penstemon
 Penstemon barnebyi N.H.Holmgren – Barneby's penstemon, White River Valley beardtongue
 Penstemon barrettiae A.Gray – Barrett's beardtongue
 Penstemon bicolor (Brandegee) Clokey & D.D.Keck – pinto beardtongue, pinto penstemon
 Penstemon bleaklyi O'Kane & K.D.Heil
 Penstemon bolanus Straw
 Penstemon bracteatus D.D.Keck – Red Canyon beardtongue
 Penstemon bradburyi Pursh
 Penstemon breviculus (D.D.Keck) G.T.Nisbet & R.C.Jacks. – shortstem beardtongue, shortstem penstemon
 Penstemon brevisepalus Pennell – short-sepaled beardtongue
 Penstemon buckleyi Pennell – buckley penstemon, Buckley's beardtongue
 Penstemon caesius A.Gray – San Bernardino beardtongue
 Penstemon caespitosus Nutt. ex A.Gray – mat penstemon
 Penstemon calcareus Brandegee – limestone beardtongue
 Penstemon californicus (Munz & I.M.Johnst.) D.D.Keck – California penstemon
 Penstemon calycosus Small – longsepal beardtongue
 Penstemon campanulatus (Cav.) Willd. – bellflower beardtongue
 Penstemon canescens Britton – eastern gray beardtongue
 Penstemon cardinalis Wooton & Standl. – cardinal beardtongue
 Penstemon cardwellii Howell – Cardwell's beardtongue
 Penstemon carnosus Pennell – fleshy beardtongue
 Penstemon caryi Pennell – Cary's beardtongue
 Penstemon cedrosensis Krautter
 Penstemon centranthifolius (Benth.) Benth. – scarlet bugler
 Penstemon cinicola D.D.Keck – ash penstemon
 Penstemon clevelandii A.Gray – Cleveland's beardtongue
 Penstemon clutei A.Nelson – Sunset Crater beardtongue, Sunset Crater penstemon
 Penstemon cobaea Nutt. – cobaea beardtongue, Cobaea penstemon
 Penstemon comarrhenus A.Gray – dusty beardtongue, dusty penstemon
 Penstemon concinnus D.D.Keck – Tunnel Springs beardtongue, Tunnel Springs penstemon
 Penstemon confertus Douglas – yellow penstemon
 Penstemon confusus M.E.Jones – Owens Valley beardtongue, Owens Valley penstemon
 Penstemon crandallii A.Nelson – Crandall's beardtongue
 Penstemon cusickii A.Gray – Cusick's beardtongue
 Penstemon cyananthus Hook. – Wasatch beardtongue
 Penstemon cyaneus Pennell – blue penstemon
 Penstemon cyanocaulis Payson – bluestem beardtongue
 Penstemon cyathophorus Rydb. – Northpark penstemon, sagebrush beardtongue
 Penstemon dasyphyllus A.Gray – Cochise beardtongue, purple penstemon
 Penstemon davidsonii Greene – Davidson's penstemon, timberline penstemon
 Penstemon deamii Pennell – Deam's beardtongue
 Penstemon deaveri Crosswh. – Mt. Graham beardtongue
 Penstemon debilis O'Kane & J.L.Anderson – Parachute beardtongue
 Penstemon degeneri Crosswh. – Degener's beardtongue
 Penstemon deustus Douglas ex Lindl. – scabland penstemon
 Penstemon digitalis Nutt. ex Sims – talus slope penstemon, foxglove beardtongue
 Penstemon diphyllus Rydb. – twoleaf beardtongue
 Penstemon discolor D.D.Keck – Catalina beardtongue
 Penstemon dissectus Elliott – dissected beardtongue
 Penstemon distans N.H.Holmgren – Mt. Tumbull beardtongue
 Penstemon dolius M.E.Jones – Jones's penstemon, Jones' beardtongue
 Penstemon duchesnensis (N.H.Holmgren) Neese
 Penstemon eatonii A.Gray – Eaton penstemon, Eaton's penstemon, firecracker penstemon
 Penstemon elegantulus Pennell – rockvine penstemon
 Penstemon ellipticus J.M.Coult. & Fisher – rocky ledge penstemon
 Penstemon erianthera Fraser ex Nutt. – fuzzytongue penstemon
 Penstemon euglaucus English – glaucous beardtongue
 Penstemon eximius D.D.Keck – unusual beardtongue
 Penstemon fasciculatus A.Gray
 Penstemon fendleri Torr. & A.Gray – fendler penstemon, Fendler's beardtongue, Fendler's penstemon
 Penstemon filiformis (D.D.Keck) D.D.Keck – Keck threadleaf beardtongue
 Penstemon filisepalis Straw
 Penstemon flavescens Pennell – high mountain penstemon
 Penstemon floribundus Danley – Cordillia's beardtongue, Cordillia's penstemon
 Penstemon floridus Brandegee – Panamint beardtongue, Panamint penstemon
 Penstemon flowersii Neese & S.L.Welsh – Flowers' beardtongue
 Penstemon franklinii S.L.Welsh – Franklin's penstemon
 Penstemon fremontii Torr. & A.Gray – Fremont penstemon, Fremont's beardtongue
 Penstemon fruticiformis Coville – Death Valley beardtongue, Death Valley penstemon
 Penstemon fruticosus (Pursh) Greene – Greene bush penstemon
 Penstemon gairdneri Hook. – Gairdner's beardtongue
 Penstemon galloensis G.L.Nesom
 Penstemon gentianoides (Kunth) Poir.
 Penstemon gentryi Standl.
 Penstemon gibbensii Dorn – Gibbens' beardtongue
 Penstemon glaber Pursh – sawsepal penstemon, western smooth beardtongue
 Penstemon glandulosus Douglas ex Lindl. – stickystem penstemon
 Penstemon glaucinus Pennell – blueleaf beardtongue
 Penstemon globosus (Piper) Pennell & D.D.Keck – globe penstemon
 Penstemon goodrichii N.H.Holmgren – Lapoint beardtongue
 Penstemon gormanii Greene – Gorman's beardtongue
 Penstemon gracilentus A.Gray – slender penstemon
 Penstemon gracilis Nutt. – lilac penstemon, slender penstemon
 Penstemon grahamii D.D.Keck – Uinta Basin beardtongue
 Penstemon griffinii A.Nelson – Griffin's beardtongue
 Penstemon grinnellii Eastw. – Grinnell's beardtongue
 Penstemon guadalupensis A.Heller – Guadalupe beardtongue
 Penstemon hallii A.Gray – Hall's beardtongue
 Penstemon harbourii A.Gray – Harbour's beardtongue
 Penstemon harringtonii Penland – Harrington's beardtongue
 Penstemon hartwegii Benth. – Hartweg's beardtongue
 Penstemon havardii A.Gray – Big Bend beardtongue
 Penstemon haydenii S.Watson ex J.M.Coult. – blowout beardtongue, blowout penstemon
 Penstemon henricksonii Straw
 Penstemon heterodoxus A.Gray – Sierra beardtongue, Sierra penstemon
 Penstemon heterophyllus Lindl. – bunchleaf penstemon
 Penstemon hidalgensis Straw
 Penstemon hirsutus (L.) Willd. – hairy beardtongue
 Penstemon humilis Nutt. ex A.Gray – low beardtongue, low penstemon
 Penstemon imberbis (Kunth) Trautv.
 Penstemon immanifestus N.H.Holmgren – Steptoe Valley beardtongue, Steptoe Valley penstemon
 Penstemon incertus Brandegee – Mojave beardtongue
 Penstemon inflatus Crosswh. – inflated beardtongue
 Penstemon isophyllus B.L.Rob.
 Penstemon jamesii Benth. – James penstemon, James' beardtongue
 Penstemon janishiae N.H.Holmgren – Antelope Valley beardtongue, Janish's penstemon
 Penstemon kingii S.Watson – King's beardtongue, King's penstemon
 Penstemon kralii D.Estes
 Penstemon labrosus (A.Gray) Mast. ex Hook.f. – San Gabriel beardtongue
 Penstemon laetus A.Gray – mountain blue penstemon
 Penstemon laevigatus Aiton – eastern smooth beardtongue
 Penstemon laevis Pennell – southwestern beardtongue, southwestern penstemon
 Penstemon lanceolatus Benth.
 Penstemon laricifolius Hook. & Arn. – larchleaf beardtongue
 Penstemon laxiflorus Pennell – nodding beardtongue
 Penstemon laxus A.Nelson – tufted penstemon
 Penstemon leiophyllus Pennell – smoothleaf beardtongue, smoothleaf penstemon
 Penstemon lemhiensis (D.D.Keck) D.D.Keck & Cronquist – Lemhi penstemon
 Penstemon lentus Pennell – handsome beardtongue, handsome penstemon
 Penstemon leonardii Rydb. – Leonard's beardtongue, Leonard's penstemon
 Penstemon leonensis Straw
 Penstemon linarioides A.Gray – creeping penstemon, toadflax penstemon
 Penstemon longiflorus (Pennell) S.L.Clark – longflower penstemon
 Penstemon luteus G.L.Nesom
 Penstemon lyallii (A.Gray) A.Gray – Lyall's beardtongue
 Penstemon marcusii (D.D.Keck) N.H.Holmgren – Marcus' beardtongue
 Penstemon mensarum Pennell – tiger beardtongue
 Penstemon metcalfei Wooton & Standl. – Metcalfe's beardtongue
 Penstemon miniatus Lindl.
 Penstemon miser A.Gray – Malheur penstemon
 Penstemon moffatii Eastw. – Moffatt's beardtongue
 Penstemon mohinoranus Straw
 Penstemon monoensis A.Heller – Mono penstemon
 Penstemon montanus Greene – cordroot beardtongue
 Penstemon moriahensis N.H.Holmgren – Mount Moriah penstemon, Mt. Moriah beardtongue
 Penstemon mucronatus N.H.Holmgren
 Penstemon multiflorus (Benth.) Chapm. ex Small – manyflower beardtongue
 Penstemon murrayanus Hook. – scarlet beardtongue
 Penstemon nanus D.D.Keck – dwarf beardtongue
 Penstemon navajoa N.H.Holmgren – Navajo Mountain beardtongue
 Penstemon neomexicanus Wooton & Standl. – New Mexico beardtongue
 Penstemon neotericus D.D.Keck – Plumas County beardtongue

 Penstemon newberryi A.Gray – mountain pride, pride-of-the-mountains
 Penstemon nitidus Douglas ex Benth. – waxleaf penstemon
 Penstemon nudiflorus A.Gray – Flagstaff beardtongue
 Penstemon occiduus Straw
 Penstemon oklahomensis Pennell – Oklahoma beardtongue, Oklahoma penstemon
 Penstemon oliganthus Wooton & Standl. – Apache beardtongue
 Penstemon ophianthus Pennell – Arizona beardtongue, coiled anther penstemon
 Penstemon osterhoutii Pennell – Osterhout's beardtongue
 Penstemon ovatus Douglas – eggleaf beardtongue
 Penstemon pachyphyllus A.Gray ex Rydb. – thickleaf beardtongue, thickleaf penstemon
 Penstemon pahutensis N.H.Holmgren – Pahute penstemon, Paiute beardtongue
 Penstemon pallidus Small – pale beardtongue
 Penstemon palmeri A.Gray – Palmer's penstemon, Palmer penstemon
 Penstemon papillatus J.T.Howell – Inyo beardtongue
 Penstemon parryi A.Gray – Gray Parry penstemon, Parry's beardtongue
 Penstemon parvulus (A.Gray) Krautter – Aquarius Plateau beardtongue
 Penstemon parvus Pennell
 Penstemon patens (M.E.Jones) N.H.Holmgren – Lone Pine beardtongue, Lone Pine penstemon
 Penstemon payettensis A.Nelson & J.F.Macbr. – Payette beardtongue
 Penstemon paysoniorum D.D.Keck – Payson's beardtongue
 Penstemon peckii Pennell – Peck's beardtongue
 Penstemon penlandii W.A.Weber – penland beardtongue, Penland's beardtongue
 Penstemon pennellianus D.D.Keck – Blue Mountain beardtongue
 Penstemon perfoliatus Al.Brongn.
 Penstemon perpulcher A.Nelson – Minidoka beardtongue
 Penstemon personatus D.D.Keck – closethroat beardtongue
 Penstemon petiolatus Brandegee – lime penstemon, petiolate beardtongue
 Penstemon pinifolius Greene – pineneedle beardtongue, pineneedle penstemon
 Penstemon pinorum L.M.Shultz & J.S.Shultz – Pine Valley penstemon
 Penstemon plagapineus Straw
 Penstemon platyphyllus Rydb. – broadleaf beardtongue, broadleaf penstemon
 Penstemon potosinus Straw
 Penstemon pratensis Greene – whiteflower beardtongue, western whiteflower penstemon
 Penstemon procerus Douglas ex Graham – littleflower penstemon, pincushion beardtongue
 Penstemon pruinosus Douglas – Chelan beardtongue
 Penstemon pseudoparvus Crosswh. – Mt. Washington beardtongue, San Mateo penstemon
 Penstemon pseudoputus (Crosswh.) N.H.Holmgren – Kaibab Plateau beardtongue
 Penstemon pseudospectabilis M.E.Jones – desert penstemon
 Penstemon pudicus Reveal & Beatley – bashful penstemon, Kawich Range beardtongue
 Penstemon pumilus Nutt. – Salmon River beardtongue
 Penstemon punctatus Brandegee
 Penstemon purpusii Brandegee – Snow Mountain beardtongue
 Penstemon putus A.Nelson – Black River beardtongue
 Penstemon radicosus A.Nelson – matroot penstemon
 Penstemon rattanii A.Gray – Rattan's beardtongue
 Penstemon richardsonii Douglas ex Lindl. – cutleaf beardtongue
 Penstemon roezlii Regel – Roezl's penstemon
 Penstemon roseus (Cerv. ex Sweet) G.Don
 Penstemon rostriflorus Kellogg – beaked beardtongue, beakflower penstemon, Bridge penstemon
 Penstemon rotundifolius A.Gray
 Penstemon rubicundus D.D.Keck – Wassuck penstemon, Wassuk Range beardtongue
 Penstemon rupicola (Piper) Howell – cliff beardtongue
 Penstemon rydbergii A.Nelson – meadow beardtongue, Rydberg penstemon, Rydberg's penstemon
 Penstemon saltarius Crosswh.
 Penstemon saxosorum Pennell – upland beardtongue
 Penstemon scapoides D.D.Keck – pinyon beardtongue
 Penstemon scariosus Pennell – White River beardtongue
 Penstemon schaffneri (Hemsl.) Straw
 Penstemon secundiflorus Benth. – sidebells penstemon
 Penstemon seorsus (A.Nelson) D.D.Keck – shortlobe penstemon
 Penstemon sepalulus A.Nelson – littlecup beardtongue
 Penstemon serrulatus Menzies ex Sm. – serrulate penstemon
 Penstemon smallii A.Heller – Small's beardtongue
 Penstemon spatulatus Pennell
 Penstemon speciosus Douglas – prairie-clover, royal penstemon
 Penstemon spectabilis Thurb. ex A.Gray – showy penstemon
 Penstemon stenophyllus A.Gray – Sonoran beardtongue
 Penstemon stephensii Brandegee – Stephens' penstemon
 Penstemon strictiformis Rydb. – Mancos penstemon, stiff penstemon
 Penstemon strictus Benth. – Rocky Mountain beardtongue, Rocky Mountain penstemon
 Penstemon subglaber Rydb. – smooth penstemon
 Penstemon subserratus Pennell – finetooth beardtongue
 Penstemon subulatus M.E.Jones – hackberry beardtongue
 Penstemon sudans M.E.Jones – Susanville beardtongue, Susanville penstemon
 Penstemon superbus A.Nelson – superb beardtongue
 Penstemon tenuiflorus Pennell – eastern whiteflower beardtongue
 Penstemon tenuifolius Benth.
 Penstemon tenuis Small – sharpsepal beardtongue
 Penstemon tepicensis Straw
 Penstemon teucrioides Greene – germander beardtongue
 Penstemon thompsoniae (A.Gray) Rydb. – Thompson's penstemon, Thompson's beardtongue, Thompson penstemon
 Penstemon thurberi Torr. – Thurber's penstemon, Thurber penstemon
 Penstemon tidestromii Pennell – Tidestrom's beardtongue
 Penstemon tracyi D.D.Keck – Trinity penstemon
 Penstemon triflorus A.Heller – Heller's beardtongue
 Penstemon triphyllus Douglas – Riggin's penstemon
 Penstemon tubaeflorus Nutt. – white wand beardtongue
 Penstemon uintahensis Pennell – Uinta Mountain beardtongue
 Penstemon utahensis Eastw. – Utah penstemon
 Penstemon venustus Douglas – Venus penstemon
 Penstemon virens Pennell ex Rydb. – Front Range beardtongue
 Penstemon virgatus A.Gray – upright blue beardtongue
 Penstemon vizcainensis Moran
 Penstemon vulcanellus Crosswh.
 Penstemon wardii A.Gray – Ward's beardtongue
 Penstemon washingtonensis D.D.Keck – Washington beardtongue
 Penstemon watsonii A.Gray – Watson's penstemon, Watson's beardtongue, Watson penstemon
 Penstemon wendtiorum B.L.Turner
 Penstemon whippleanus A.Gray – dark beardtongue, Whipple's penstemon
 Penstemon wilcoxii Rydb. – Wilcox's penstemon
 Penstemon wislizeni (A.Gray) Straw
 Penstemon wrightii Hook. – Wright's beardtongue
 Penstemon yampaensis Penland – Yampa beardtongue

Natural hybrids
These five naturally occurring hybrids are valid according to WFO and POWO.

 Penstemon × crideri A.Nelson – Crider penstemon, Crider's penstemon
 Penstemon × dubius Davidson – dubius penstemon
 Penstemon × mirus A.Nelson
 Penstemon × parishii A.Gray
 Penstemon × peirsonii Munz & I.M.Johnst.

Ambiguous species
These 35 species and two natural hybrids are of uncertain validity. Twenty-seven are recognized as valid by either WFO or POWO, but not both. The USDA Natural Resources Conservation Service PLANTS database (PLANTS) uses eight species not recognized by either WFO or POWO.
 Penstemon alluviorum Pennell – lowland beardtongue
 Penstemon angelicus (I.M.Johnst.) Moran
 Penstemon brandegeei (Porter) Rydb.
 Penstemon brevibarbatus Crosswhite
 Penstemon bryantiae D.D. Keck
 Penstemon cerrosensis Kellogg
 Penstemon compactus (D.D.Keck) Crosswh. – compact penstemon
 Penstemon curtiflorus (D.D.Keck) N.H.Holmgren
 Penstemon dugesii Pérez-Calix & Zacarías
 Penstemon grandiflorus Nutt. – large beardtongue, largeflowered penstemon
 Penstemon hesperius M.E.Peck
 Penstemon idahoensis N.D.Atwood & S.L.Welsh – Idaho beardtongue
 Penstemon jaliscensis B.L.Rob.
 Penstemon jonesii Pennell – Jones' penstemon
 Penstemon laevigatus Soland.
 Penstemon leptanthus Pennell – Sevier Plateau beardtongue
 Penstemon minutifolius Straw
 Penstemon moronensis Crosswh.
 Penstemon parishii A.Gray – Parish's penstemon
 Penstemon parviflorus Pennell – Montezuma County beardtongue
 Penstemon reidmoranii Zacarías & A.Wolfe
 Penstemon ramosus Crosswh. – lanceleaf beardtongue, lanceleaf penstemon
 Penstemon retrorsoides Crosswh. – Adobe Hills beardtongue
 Penstemon retrorsus Payson
 Penstemon rhizomatosus N.H.Holmgren
 Penstemon salmonensis N.H.Holmgren
 Penstemon spathulatus Eastw. ex C.F.Baker – Wallowa beardtongue
 Penstemon tiehmii N.H.Holmgren – Tiehm's beardtongue
 Penstemon tubiflorus Nutt.
 Penstemon tusharensis Penstemon tusharensis N.H.Holmgren – Tushar Range beardtongue
 Penstemon unilateralis Rydb.
 Penstemon versicolor Pennell
 Penstemon xylus A.Nelson
 Penstemon × jonesii Pennell
 Penstemon × moronensis Crosswh.

See also 
 HMS Pentstemon

References

Further reading 
 Way, D. and P. James. The Gardener's Guide to Growing Penstemons. David & Charles Publishers. 1998. 
 Nold, Robert. Penstemons. Timber Press. 1999. 
 Lindgren, Dale T. Growing penstemons : species, cultivars, and hybrids. Haverford, PA: Infinity Pub. 2003. .

External links 
 American Penstemon Society
 Wolfe Lab Penstemon Database

 
Medicinal plants
Plantaginaceae genera